Davao Oriental's 1st congressional district is one of the two congressional districts of the Philippines in the province of Davao Oriental. It has been represented in the House of Representatives since 1987. The district covers the northern municipalities of Baganga, Boston, Caraga, Cateel, Manay and Tarragona. It is currently represented in the 19th Congress by Nelson Dayanghirang of the Nacionalista Party (NP).

Representation history

Election results

2022

2019

2016

2013

2010

See also
Legislative districts of Davao Oriental

References

Congressional districts of the Philippines
Politics of Davao Oriental
1987 establishments in the Philippines
Congressional districts of the Davao Region
Constituencies established in 1987